Petter Vågan  (born 6 July 1982 in Brønnøysund, Northern Norway) is a Norwegian singer, guitarist, composer, and the younger brother of double bass player Ole Morten Vågan. He is the bandleader, singer, and guitarist of the Norwegian indie electronica band The Fjords, founded in 2013.

Career
Vågan is based in Trondheim, where he got a performing master's degree in improvisation at the Jazz Dept at Trondheim Musikkonservatorium. In addition to his latest endeavours in pop music, he has delved into various forms of improvisation. He has released several records as a leader and band member with an experimental style rooted somewhere between electronic music, free jazz, rock, free improvisation, and noise music.

He has toured extensively in Scandinavia, Russia, U.S., Japan, South Africa, Canada, Germany, and the Netherlands, and collaborated with many improvising musicians in Norway.

Discography
 2006: Slant of Light (Jazzaway), within Eyewaterlillies
 2007: Selected Recordings, within Peloton
 2008: That is a Step (FMR), within duo Petter O Hanna (Hanna Gjermundrød)
 2009: Trondheim Jazz Orchestra & Kobert (MNJ)
 2010: "Shapes & Phases" (Sofa), Vertex
 2010: A festa Vale Tudo, within Erik Nylanders Orkester
 2010: Facienda (Jazzland), within Motif
 2010: Shapes and Phases (Sofa), within Vertex
 2010: Tsar Bomba, within Juxtaposed
 2010: Marianne Halmrast Kvintett (Aim)
 2010: Lucy (STWD), with Samuel Tramp
 2011: Volt/Revolt (Gigafon), within Marvel Machine
 2011: Treehouse
 2012: Early Years, within Peloton
 2012: Scent of Soil (Hubro), with Tore Brunborg and Kirsti Huke
 2013: Rendition of a Whisper (Gigafon), Petter O Hanna
 2013: 7th Day Saviour (Aspén), Kari Harneshaug
 2013: Babylove (Propeller), Ingrid
 2014: All In (Impeller), The Fjords

References

External links

 The Fjords Official website

Norwegian pop singers
Norwegian guitarists
Norwegian male guitarists
Norwegian composers
Norwegian male composers
Hubro Music artists
Musicians from Brønnøy
Living people
1982 births
21st-century Norwegian singers
21st-century Norwegian guitarists
21st-century Norwegian male singers
Trondheim Jazz Orchestra members